Let  be a positive integer.

The function is named after Camille Jordan.

Definition

For each , Jordan's totient function  is multiplicative and may be evaluated as

Properties

 
which may be written in the language of Dirichlet convolutions as
 
and via Möbius inversion as
.
.

.

 The Dedekind psi function is
,

 .

Order of matrix groups

 The general linear group of matrices of order  over  has order

 The special linear group of matrices of order  over  has order

 The symplectic group of matrices of order  over  has order

The first two formulas were discovered by Jordan.

Examples

                        
                

Notes

References

External links

 

Modular arithmetic
Multiplicative functions